A scrunchie (or scrunchy) is a fabric-covered elastic hair tie used to fasten medium to long hair types. The elastic hair tie is encased in loose fabric that forms a ruffle when twisted around a ponytail.  Large, elaborate styles and diminutive, unassuming forms are available in many different colors, fabrics, and designs.

History

The scrunchie was invented in the 1960s,  but it was patented in 1987 by Rommy Hunt Revson. She created the first prototype of the scrunchie because she wanted a gentler version of the metal hair ties used in the 1980s. Prior to this, Revson was a house sitter in the Hamptons.  She bought herself a $50 sewing machine and learned how to sew, developing the working prototype within weeks. Revson was inspired by the design of the elastic waistband on her sweatpants  and named the decorative hair accessory the Scunci after her pet toy poodle. The name scrunchie was a natural evolution, because the fabric scrunched up. After patenting the scrunchie, Revson spent most of her time in legal disputes, both with manufacturers and her own lawyers. Scrunchies were particularly popular in the 1980s and 1990s, including larger, more elaborate versions. Scrunchies regained popularity in the mid 2010s.

Popularity
Revson's scrunchies were extremely popular in the 1980s and 1990s. Scrunchies initially became popular in the 80s because they were a less damaging alternative for pulling big hair up. Also, scrunchies came in many different colors and patterns, so they matched the colorful and over-the-top aesthetic of the 1980s. Well-known celebrities such as Janet Jackson, Paula Abdul, Demi Moore, and Sarah Jessica Parker were all seen wearing them.  Debbie Gibson in particular wore them; Madonna wore a large velvet scrunchie in Desperately Seeking Susan.  Scrunchies were also featured in popular movies like Heathers, being passed from one Heather to another based on popularity shifts. The popularity of scrunchies continued into the 1990s as well. This time, scrunchies made an appearance in shows such as Friends, Full House, and Seinfeld. The scrunchie's popularity was not limited to celebrities and television, however; many female astronauts used them to secure their hair while they were on a mission.

The early 2000s marked a fall in the popularity of scrunchies. Carrie Bradshaw in an episode of Sex and the City mocked the fashion, saying “No woman … would be caught dead at a hip downtown restaurant wearing a scrunchie." This comment represented the decline in popularity of the scrunchie during this time period, sparking a decade's worth of negative views and distaste. The scrunchie became a faux pas in the sense that wearing it around was embarrassing. 

Even after its loss of popularity, the scrunchie made a comeback in the late 2010s. It was seen all over runways making its way back into fashion. In 2017, scrunchies appeared at the New York Fashion Week as part of Mansur Gavriel's fall 2017 collection. It was an event that fashion publications like Vogue and Harper's Bazaar would mention in their own articles; scrunchies were coming back but as low, loose ponytails rather than on top of the head.  A Vogue editor even included the scrunchie in a "can't-live-without hair products" list coining it as an essential accessory for makeup-removal time at the end of the workday. The scrunchie has expanded on its popularity, with even Balenciaga getting involved, selling an "XXL" silk scrunchie for $275.

Scrunchies are no stranger to the public sphere, making their way into the hair and on the wrists of celebrities. Famous women such as Hailey Bieber, Bella Hadid, Gigi Hadid, Ruth Bader Ginsburg, and Selena Gomez have all been seen wearing them again. Famous singer Lizzo generated news when she wore a $100 scruchie with jewels on it backstage at MTV's Video Music Awards. It was featured in the popular Netflix original movie To All the Boys I've Loved Before as a symbol of power struggle between main character Lara Jean and her former BFF and the character Eleven on Stranger Things was seen wearing them in the third season of the show in 2019.

Scrunchies are often exchanged between tweens and young teens as a sign of an emerging romance. Generally, a girl will give a boy a scrunchie as a sign of affection or to say that he is "cute" or that he is her "crush", and the boy will wear the scrunchie usually on his wrist.
  
Scrunchies are also an integral part of the VSCO girl aesthetic, which is a trend that is discussed greatly on an app called TikTok.  The VSCO girl is seen as a teen aesthetic among Gen Z culture, and the most prominent addition to the look is an armful of scrunchies. The re-surge in popularity is partly attributed to the rise in nostalgic culture at the end of the 2010s. Another reason cited for its rise in popularity in the late 2010s is an increased emphasis on hair health, the scrunchie is gentler on curly, coarse, or kinkier hair than normal hair ties. They also add volume to buns without having to use hair bun inserts to create a doughnut shape, and they help to avoid creating dents in the hair.

Types and variations
There are over five hundred different designs of scrunchies since its invention. There are many different brands and stores that sell them. In the US, almost every major store sold some sort of scrunchie in 2019. The Scünci-brand offers a range of textures, including velvet, satin, and fur, as well as various designs such as neon and metallic. There are also different variations of the scrunchie. There is a scrunchie bow, which is a normal scrunchie with a small and short or large and long bow on one side of it. There are also different patterns, such as leopard print, tie-dye, and dotted. There are also scrunchies with prints of animals or pictures of flowers on them.

References

External links
 Instructions for making a scrunchie

Headgear
Fashion accessories